The Actors is a 2003 film written and directed by Conor McPherson and starring Dylan Moran and Michael Caine. In supporting roles are Michael Gambon, Miranda Richardson and Lena Headey.

The Actors is a contemporary comedy set in Dublin. It follows the exploits of two mediocre stage actors as they devise a plan to con a retired gangster out of £50,000. The gangster owes the money to a third party, whom he has never met.

The actors take advantage of this fact by impersonating this 'unidentified' third party, and claiming the debt as their own. To pull it off they enlist Moran's eerily intelligent nine-year-old niece, who restructures the plan each time something goes wrong.

The two protagonists are acting in a version of Shakespeare's Richard III in which everyone dresses in Nazi uniform, a sly nod to Ian McKellen's production.

The film is centred on the Olympia Theatre, and it is noteworthy for featuring the famous glass awning over the entrance which has since been destroyed in a traffic accident. The glass awning has since been rebuilt to its full former glory.

Cast
Michael Caine as Anthony O'Malley
Dylan Moran as Tom Quirk
Lena Headey as Dolores
Abigail Iversen as Mary
Aisling O'Sullivan as Rita
Ben Miller as Clive
Michael Gambon as Barreller
Simon Delaney as Ronnie 
Alvaro Lucchesi as Lesley
Michael McElhatton as Jock
Miranda Richardson as Mrs. Magnani
Alison Doody as herself
Marty Whelan as himself 
Deirdre O'Kane as Stage Manager

Reception 
Empire gives the film 2/5, describing it as "Based on an idea by Neil Jordan, The Actors had the potential to be gut-achingly funny. But instead it ends up raising a few paltry smiles."

Soundtrack 

 Act One - The Michael Nyman Band and Moss Hall Junior Choir
 Star Of The Sea - Laura Cullinan, Bebhinn Ni Chiosain, Cliona Ni Chiosain & Niamh H Reynolds
 Zinc Bar Walk - The Michael Nyman Band
 A Certain Party - The Michael Nyman Band
 House On Fire - The Michael Nyman Band
 Act Two - The Michael Nyman Band
 Could This Be Love? - Lena Headey & Dylan Moran
 Mary Directs Tom - The Michael Nyman Band
 Una's Waltz - Una Ni Chiosain/Conor McPherson
 Rope Trick - The Michael Nyman Band
 Dolores On The Beach - The Michael Nyman Band
 Return To The Scene Of The Crime - The Michael Nyman Band
 Seems So Long - Cathy Davey
 Wheelchair Chase - The Michael Nyman Band
 Tubbetstown Elegy - The Michael Nyman Band
 Lovely Morning - Cathy Davey
 Mrs O'Growny Appears - The Michael Nyman Band
 Zinc Piano - The Michael Nyman Band
 Final Act - The Michael Nyman Band

References

External links
 
 The Actors at Rotten Tomatoes

2003 films
Irish comedy films
Films set in Dublin (city)
English-language Irish films
2003 comedy films
Films scored by Michael Nyman
2000s English-language films
Films directed by Conor McPherson